Typhinellus is a genus of sea snails, marine gastropod mollusks in the family Muricidae, the murex snails or rock snails.

It was first described by Félix Pierre Jousseaume in 1880.

Species
Species within the genus Typhinellus include:
 Typhinellus amoenus Houart, 1994<
 Typhinellus androyensis Bozzetti, 2007
 Typhinellus bicolor Bozzetti, 2007
 † Typhinellus chipolanus (Gertman, 1969) 
 Typhinellus constrictus Houart & Héros, 2015
 Typhinellus insolitus (Houart, 1991)
 Typhinellus jacolombi Houart, 2015
 Typhinellus labiatus (de Cristofori & Jan, 1832)
 Typhinellus laminatus Houart & Héros, 2015
 Typhinellus mirbatensis Houart, Gori & Rosado, 2015
 Typhinellus occlusus (Garrard, 1963)
Species brought into synonymy
 Typhinellus lamyi Garrigues & Merle, 2014: synonym of Typhina lamyi (Garrigues & Merle, 2014) (original combination)
 Typhinellus sowerbyi (Broderip, 1833): synonym of Typhinellus labiatus (de Cristofori & Jan, 1832)

References

 Houart, R, Buge, B. & Zuccon, D. (2021). A taxonomic update of the Typhinae (Gastropoda: Muricidae) with a review of New Caledonia species and the description of new species from New Caledonia, the South China Sea and Western Australia. Journal of Conchology. 44(2): 103–147.

External links
 Jousseaume, F. P. (1880). Division méthodique de la famille des Purpuridés. Le Naturaliste. 2(42): 335-338

 
Muricidae
Gastropod genera
Gastropods described in 1880
Taxa named by Félix Pierre Jousseaume